The Commelinales are an order of flowering plants. It comprises five families: Commelinaceae, Haemodoraceae, Hanguanaceae, Philydraceae, and Pontederiaceae. All the families combined contain over 885 species in about 70 genera; the majority of species are in the Commelinaceae. Plants in the order share a number of synapomorphies that tie them together, such as a lack of mycorrhizal associations and tapetal raphides. Estimates differ as to when the Comminales evolved, but most suggest an origin and diversification sometime during the mid- to late Cretaceous. The order's closest relatives are in the Zingiberales. The anthophytes are a grouping of plant taxa bearing flower-like reproductive structures. They were formerly thought to be a clade comprising plants bearing flower-like structures.  The group contained the angiosperms - the extant flowering plants, such as roses and grasses - as well as the Gnetales and the extinct Bennettitales.

23,420 species of vascular plant have been recorded in South Africa, making it the sixth most species-rich country in the world and the most species-rich country on the African continent. Of these, 153 species are considered to be threatened. Nine biomes have been described in South Africa: Fynbos, Succulent Karoo, desert, Nama Karoo, grassland, savanna, Albany thickets, the Indian Ocean coastal belt, and forests.

The 2018 South African National Biodiversity Institute's National Biodiversity Assessment plant checklist lists 35,130 taxa in the phyla Anthocerotophyta (hornworts (6)), Anthophyta (flowering plants (33534)), Bryophyta (mosses (685)), Cycadophyta (cycads (42)), Lycopodiophyta (Lycophytes(45)), Marchantiophyta (liverworts (376)), Pinophyta (conifers (33)), and Pteridophyta (cryptogams (408)).

Three families are represented in the literature. Listed taxa include species, subspecies, varieties, and forms as recorded, some of which have subsequently been allocated to other taxa as synonyms, in which cases the accepted taxon is appended to the listing. Multiple entries under alternative names reflect taxonomic revision over time.

Commelinaceae
Family: Commelinaceae,

Aneilema
Genus Aneilema:
 Aneilema aequinoctiale (P.Beauv.) Loudon, indigenous
 Aneilema arenicola Faden, indigenous
 Aneilema brunneospermum Faden, indigenous
 Aneilema dregeanum Kunth, indigenous
 Aneilema dregeanum Kunth subsp. dregeanum,  indigenous
 Aneilema hockii De Wild. indigenous
 Aneilema hockii De Wild. subsp. hockii,  indigenous
 Aneilema hockii De Wild. subsp. longiaxis Faden, indigenous
 Aneilema indehiscens Faden, indigenous
 Aneilema indehiscens Faden subsp. lilacinum Faden, indigenous
 Aneilema longirrhizum Faden, endemic
 Aneilema nicholsonii C.B.Clarke, indigenous
 Aneilema zebrinum Chiov. indigenous

Callisia
Genus Callisia:
 Callisia fragrans (Lindl.) Woodson, not indigenous, cultivated, naturalised
 Callisia repens (Jacq.) L. not indigenous, naturalised, invasive

Coleotrype
Genus Coleotrype:
 Coleotrype natalensis C.B.Clarke, indigenous
 Commelina africana L. indigenous
 Commelina africana L. var. africana,  indigenous
 Commelina africana L. var. barberae (C.B.Clarke) C.B.Clarke, indigenous
 Commelina africana L. var. krebsiana (Kunth) C.B.Clarke, indigenous
 Commelina africana L. var. lancispatha C.B.Clarke, indigenous
 Commelina bella Oberm. endemic
 Commelina benghalensis L. indigenous
 Commelina diffusa Burm.f. indigenous
 Commelina diffusa Burm.f. subsp. diffusa,  indigenous
 Commelina diffusa Burm.f. subsp. scandens (Welw. ex C.B.Clarke) Oberm. indigenous
 Commelina eckloniana Kunth, indigenous
 Commelina erecta L. indigenous
 Commelina forskaolii Vahl, indigenous
 Commelina imberbis Ehrenb. ex Hassk. indigenous
 Commelina krebsiana Kunth, accepted as Commelina africana L. var. krebsiana (Kunth) C.B.Clarke, indigenous
 Commelina livingstonii C.B.Clarke, indigenous
 Commelina modesta Oberm. indigenous
 Commelina petersii Hassk. indigenous
 Commelina rogersii Burtt Davy, endemic
 Commelina subulata Roth, indigenous
 Commelina zambesica C.B.Clarke, indigenous

Cyanotis
Genus Cyanotis:
 Cyanotis lanata Benth. indigenous
 Cyanotis lapidosa E.Phillips, indigenous
 Cyanotis pachyrrhiza Oberm. endemic
 Cyanotis robusta Oberm. endemic
 Cyanotis speciosa (L.f.) Hassk. indigenous

Floscopa
Genus Floscopa:
 Floscopa glomerata (Willd. ex Schult. & J.H.Schult.) Hassk. indigenous

Murdannia
Genus Murdannia:
 Murdannia simplex (Vahl) Brenan, indigenous

Tradescantia
Genus Tradescantia:
 Tradescantia fluminensis Vell. not indigenous, cultivated, naturalised, invasive
 Tradescantia pallida (Rose) D.R.Hunt, not indigenous, cultivated, naturalised
 Tradescantia zebrina Bosse, not indigenous, naturalised, invasive

Zebrina
Genus Zebrina:
 Zebrina pendula Schnizl. accepted as Tradescantia zebrina Bosse, not indigenous, naturalised, invasive

Haemodoraceae
Family: Haemodoraceae,

Anigozanthos
Genus Anigozanthos:
 Anigozanthos flavidus DC. not indigenous, cultivated, naturalised, invasive

Barberetta
Genus Barberetta:
 Barberetta aurea Harv. endemic

Dilatris
Genus Dilatris:
 Dilatris corymbosa P.J.Bergius, endemic
 Dilatris ixioides Lam. endemic
 Dilatris paniculata L.f. accepted as Dilatris viscosa L.f. present
 Dilatris pillansii W.F.Barker, endemic
 Dilatris viscosa L.f. endemic

Wachendorfia
Genus Wachendorfia:
 Wachendorfia brachyandra W.F.Barker, endemic
 Wachendorfia graminifolia L.f. accepted as Wachendorfia paniculata Burm. present
 Wachendorfia multiflora (Klatt) J.C.Manning & Goldblatt, endemic
 Wachendorfia paniculata Burm. endemic
 Wachendorfia parviflora W.F.Barker, accepted as Wachendorfia multiflora (Klatt) J.C.Manning & Goldblatt, present
 Wachendorfia thyrsiflora Burm. endemic

Pontederiaceae
Family: Pontederiaceae,

Eichhornia
Genus Eichhornia:
 Eichhornia crassipes (Mart.) Solms, not indigenous, naturalised, invasive

Heteranthera
Genus Heteranthera:
 Heteranthera callifolia Rchb. ex Kunth, indigenous

Monochoria
Genus Monochoria:
 Monochoria africana (Solms) N.E.Br. indigenous

Pontederia
Genus Pontederia:
 Pontederia cordata L. not indigenous, naturalised, invasive
 Pontederia cordata L. var. ovalis Solms, not indigenous, naturalised

References

South African plant biodiversity lists
Commelinales